Pierre Dewin was a Belgian water polo player who won silver medals at the 1920 and 1924 Summer Olympics.

See also
 List of Olympic medalists in water polo (men)

References

External links

 

1894 births
Year of death missing
Belgian male water polo players
Water polo players at the 1920 Summer Olympics
Water polo players at the 1924 Summer Olympics
Olympic water polo players of Belgium
Olympic silver medalists for Belgium
Olympic medalists in water polo
Medalists at the 1924 Summer Olympics
Medalists at the 1920 Summer Olympics
Place of birth missing
20th-century Belgian people